Granskär is an island in the Kvarken ("The Throat"), the narrowest part of the Gulf of Bothnia in the northern part of the Baltic sea. It has few inhabitants, almost all Swedish-speaking. Granskär belongs to the municipality of Vaasa.

The area has been inhabited since before the time of Swedish dominion over Finland; the first habitations can be traced to at least the 11th century and possibly earlier.

Granskär is part of a larger archipelago and most of the smaller islands around Replot have traditionally been used as fishing camps. Today the buildings are generally used as summer cottages since maritime activities play a large part in the culture of the region.
Fishing is nowadays mostly a recreational activity, but there are still a number of professional fishermen active in the archipelago.

A large part of the Kvarken archipelago has been designated a UNESCO World Heritage Site.

References

Finnish islands in the Baltic
Landforms of Ostrobothnia (region)